The Victoria Cross (VC) is a military decoration awarded for valour "in the face of the enemy" to members of armed forces of some Commonwealth countries and previous British Empire territories. The VC was introduced, in Great Britain, on 29 January 1856 by Queen Victoria to reward acts of valour during the Crimean War. It takes precedence over all other orders, decorations and medals. It may be awarded to a person of any rank in any service, and to civilians under military command. All those who earn the VC have their names published in The London Gazette.

The 2nd Division was an infantry division of the British Army, which was formed and disbanded several times over a 200-year period. It was raised in 1854, to take part in the Crimean War against the Russian Empire. It played an important role in the Battle of Inkerman, and was engaged throughout the Siege of Sevastopol (1854–1855). In 1856, after the conclusion of hostilities, the division was disbanded. During the war, ten VCs were earned by members of the division. It was formed again, in 1899, for service in the Second Boer War. The division took part in all the notable battles that made up the Relief of Ladysmith. At the end of 1900, when conventional warfare ended, the division was broken-up so its forces could be reassigned in an effort to combat the Boer guerrilla tactics. During this period, a further eight VCs were earned by soldiers who were part of the division. The division was reformed in 1902, and went on to fight in many of the major battles on the Western Front during the First World War (1914–1918). During the four years of war, eighteen members of the division earned VCs. The division next saw combat during the Second World War (1939–1945), which resulted in three more soldiers being awarded the VC. Since the Second World War, the division has not been in battle and was disbanded for the final time in 2012.

Recipients

See also
 List of orders of battle for the British 2nd Division
 List of commanders of the British 2nd Division

Notes

References

Further reading

 

British recipients of the Victoria Cross
Lists of recipients of the Victoria Cross by conflict
Crimean War recipients of the Victoria Cross
Second Boer War recipients of the Victoria Cross
World War I recipients of the Victoria Cross
World War II recipients of the Victoria Cross